Sigmund Olaf Plytt Mowinckel (4 August 1884 – 4 June 1965) was a Norwegian professor, theologian and biblical scholar. He was noted for his research into the practice of religious worship in ancient Israel.

Life

Mowinckel was born at Kjerringøy in 1884 and was educated at the University of Oslo (1908; Th.D. 1916). His early research interests was the study of the Old Testament, and Assyriology. In the years 1911-13 he made study trips to Copenhagen, Marburg and Giessen. At Giessen he came into contact with Hermann Gunkel and was inspired by Gunkels understanding of the Old Testament as literature, as well as his traditio-historical method.

In 1916 he published his doctoral thesis on the prophet Nehemiah, and a companion work on the prophet Ezra. In the years 1921-24 he published Psalmenstudien, maybe his most influential work. As an Old Testament scholar he was particularly interested in the Psalms and the ancient cult of Israel. According to Clements, "Mowinckel continually developed and revised his views, notably on Israelite kingship and Psalmody".
In 1956 he published "He That Cometh: The Messiah Concept in the Old Testament and Later Judaism". For most of his professional life Mowinckel was connected to the University of Oslo and continued to lecture there as an emeritus in the 1960's. Among his students we find the norwegian biblical scholar Arvid Kapelrud. His last book in english, "Religion and Cult", was published in 1981.

Academic work and theories

Mowinckels main contribution to biblical scholarship is his work on The Psalms of the Old Testament and his study of Messianic ideas in Judaism.

The Psalms
From the 1920s, Mowinckel headed a school of thought concerning the Book of Psalms which sometimes clashed with the Form criticism conclusions of Hermann Gunkel  and those who followed in Gunkel's footsteps. In broad terms, Gunkel strongly advocated a view of the Psalms which focused on the two notable names for God occurring therein: Yahweh (JHWH sometimes called tetragrammaton) and Elohim. The schools of Psalm writing springing  therefrom were termed Yahwist and Elohist. Mowinckel's approach to the Psalms differed quite a bit from Gunkel's. Mowinckel explained the Psalms as wholly cultic, both in origin and in intention. He attempted to relate more than 40 psalms to a hypothetical New Year autumn festival, the so-called "Enthronement Festival of Yahweh". According to Mowinckel the Psalms had a practical usage in the context of the Temple service. He also suggests that the authors of the Psalms were temple singers. As for the Psalms that have no cultic context, Mowinckel identifies these as the "wisdom psalms".

Messianic ideas

In addition to his work on Psalms, his major monograph on the Old Testament roots of Messianism is of significance in scholarship until this day. In his study of Messianism in ancient Israel, and the Ancient Near East, Mowinckel identified the concept of divine kingship. He did however deny the title of Messiah to the reigning Hebrew kings, although they reflected the Messianic ideal. The kings were associated with divinity, but Mowinckel does not support the view that they were an incarnation of the deity, or that they represented a suffering, dying and rising god. The Israelites adapted some ideas on kingship from Canaanite sources, fused with traditions of old nomadic chieftainship and Yahwism. According to Mowinckel the concept of Kingship is associated with the present, while the Messiah is a future figure, associated with eschatology. The Hebrew royal line is therefore, in his view, not Messianic, and there is no eschatology prior to the Babylonian exile.

Mowinckel also considers the songs of the Suffering Servant in the Old Testament. He identifies the servant as a historical person from the circle surrounding Isaiah and Second Isaiah. He finds the servant free of kingly traits  and concludes that the songs were not originally meant to be Messianic.  The suffering servant is therefore, according to Mowinckel, something else than a Messiah, he is a «mediator of salvation» The Son of Man, on the other hand, is an eschatological figure, influenced by Messianic ideas. According to Cheroke «The Son of Man is in Mowinckel’s treatment the culmination of messianism». However, Mowinckel disagreees with other scholars, such as Joachim Jeremias, that the Son Of Man represents an atoning suffering and death. 

Mowinckel suggests that Jesus adapted both the concept of the Son of Man and the figure of the Servant, but in a paradoxical way. The concept of the Messiah is modified in order to suit his ministry and his understanding of himself. He merges the redeeming element of the Son of Man with the idea of the suffering Servant.  According to Muilenburg «Mowinckel believes that Jesus himself was the first to understand the real meaning of Isaiah 53 and to apply it to himself».

Published works (early editions)
 Statholderen Nehemia (Kristiania: a. 1916)
 Esra den skriftlærde (Kristiania: a. 1916)
 Kongesalmerne i det Gamle Testamentet (Kristiania: (1916)
 Der Knächt Jahves (1921)
 Psalmenstudien I: 'Awan und die individuellen Klagepsalmen (Kristiania: SNVAO* 1921)
 Psalmenstudien II: Das Thronbesteigungsfest Jahwäs und der Ursprung der Eschatologie (Kristiania: SNVAO* 1922)
 Psalmenstudien III: Kultprophetie und kultprophetische Psalmen (Kristiania: SNVAO*, 1923)
 Psalmenstudien IV: Die technischen Termini in den Psalmenuberschriften (Kristiania: SNVAO*, 1923)
 Psalmenstudien V: Segen und Fluch in Israels Kult und Psalmdichtung (Kristiania: SNVAO*, 1924)
 Psalmenstudien VI: Die Psalmdichter (Kristiania: SNVAO*, 1924)
 Diktet om Ijob og hans tre venner (Kristiania: 1924)
 Profeten Jesaja (Oslo: 1925)
 Jesaja: Profetien fra Jesaja til Jeremia (Oslo: 1926)
 Motiver og stilformer i profeten Jeremias diktning (1926)
 Le Decalogue (Paris: 1927)
 Det Gamle Testament som Guds Ord (Oslo: 1938)
 Gamla testamental som Guds ord (Stockholm: 1938)
 Die Erkentis Gottes bei den alttestamentlichen Propheten [translation: "The recognizable God in/within the Old Testament prophets" or perhaps "The recognition of God beside/by the Old Testament prophets"] Supplementary volume to Norsk Teologisk Tidsskrift (Oslo: 1941).
 Prophecy and Tradition (1946)
 Han som kommer : Messiasforventningen i Det gamle testament og på Jesu tid (1951) (translated He That Cometh: The Messiah Concept in the Old Testament and Later Judaism, trans. G. W. Anderson [Oxford: B.Blackwell, 1956]
 Offersang og sangoffer : salmediktningen i Bibelen [translated: "Song of sacrifice and Sacrifice of song" or "Offering song and Song offering": "Psalm Poetry in the Bible"] (Oslo: H. Aschehoug & Co, 1951).
 Der achtundsechsigste Psalm [ANVAO**, II, 1953, I] (Oslo: 1953)
 Religion och Kultus (1953).
 Real and Apparent Tricola in Hebrew Psalm Poetry [ANVAO**, II, 1957] (Oslo: 1958)
 The Spirit and the Word: Prophecy and Tradition in Ancient Israel. Edited by K. C. Hanson. Fortress Classics in Biblical Studies (Minneapolis: Fortress Press, 2002)

NOTE [*]: SNVAO signifies the Norwegian publisher/publications Skrifter utgitt av Det Norske Videnskaps-Akademi i Oslo, II. Hist.-Filos. Klasse

NOTE [**] ANVAO signifies the Norwegian publisher/publications Avhandliger utgitt av Det Norske Videnskaps-Akademi i Oslo. II. Hist. Filos. Klasse.

Articles by Mowinckel
 'Om den jodiske menighets og provinsen Judeas organisasjon ca. 400 f. Kr.', Norsk Teologisk Tidsskrift (Kristiania: 1915), pp. 123ff., 226ff.
 'Tronstigningssalmerne og Jahves tronstigningsfest', Norsk teologi til reformationsjubileet, specialhefte [i.e. special issue] to Norsk Teologisk Tidsskrift (Kristiania: 1917), pp. 13ff.
 'Die vorderasiatischen Konigs- und Fursteninschriften' [translation: "The Near Eastern Royal and Princely Inscriptions"], Eucharisterion [Studien zur Religion und Literatur d. Alt und Neu Testaments, H. Gunkel zum 60] ["Studies in the Religion and Literature of the Old and New Testaments, H. Gunkel at 60" --- Gunkel's 60th birthday was in 1922] I, pp. 278ff., a book produced by Forschungen zur Religion und Literatur d. Alten und Neuen Testaments (FRLANT) Band (Vol.) 36 (Göttingen: 1923)
 'Det kultiske synspunkt som forskningsprinsipp i den gammelstestamentlige videnskap', Norsk Teologisk Tidsskrift  (Kristiania: 1924), pp. 1ff.
 'I porten' Studier tilegnede Frans Buhl (Copenhagen: 1925)
 'Drama, religionsgeschichtlisches' [translation: "Drama, history of religion", RGG2 [appeared in Religion in Geschichte und Gegenwart 2.Aufl.] (Tübingen: 1927-32)
 'Levi und Leviten' [translation: "Levi and Levites"], RGG2 [appeared in Religion in Geschichte und Gegenwart 2.Aufl.] (Tübingen: 1927-32)
 'Stilformer og motiver i profeten Jeremias dikning', Edda  Vol. 36 (1926), pp. 276ff.
 'Salmeboken og gudstjenestesalmen', Norsk Teologisk Tidsskrift (Oslo: 1927), pp. 153ff.
 'Die letzten Worte Davids' [translation: "The last words of David"], in II Samuel 23:1-7, Zeitschrift fur die Alttestamentliche Wissenschaft'  Band (Vol.) 45? (Giessen:1927), pp. 30ff.
 'A quelle moment le culte de Jahwe a Jerusalem est il officiellement devenu un culte sans images?' [translation: "At what moment did the cult of Jahweh of Jerusalem officially become a cult without images?"] Revue de l'Histoire et des Philosophies Religieuses Vol. 9 (Strasbourg: 1929), pp. 197ff.
 The following sections/chapters in Det Gamle Testament, oversatt av S. Michelet, Sigmund Mowinckel og Nils Messel (also known simply as GTMMM) Volumes I - III (Oslo: 1929-following years):-: Sections 2. Mos. 18-34; 4. Mos. 20-25; 32-33; 5. Mosebok; Josvaboken; Samuelsboken; Kongeboken; Jesaja; Jeremia; Tolvprofetboken.
 Book review of Eduard Konig's Das Buch Hiob in Deutsche Litz, 3. Folge, 1. Jahrg. 12, (1930) columns 529ff. [presumably this review relates to E Konig's Das Buch Hiob eingeleitet, ubersetzt und erklart (Gutersloh: Bertelsmann, 1927 or 1929)]
 'Die Komposition des Deuterojesajanischen Buches' [translation: "The Composition of the book of Deutero-Isaiah"], Zeitschrift fur die Alttestamentliche Wissenschaft'  Band (Vol.) 44 (Giessen: 1931)pp. 87ff., 242ff.
 'Die Chronologie der israelitischen und judaischen Konige' [translation: "The Chronology of the Kings of Israel and Judah"], Acta Orientalia Vol. 10 (Leiden: 1932) pp. 161ff.
 'Fiendene i de individuelle klagesalmer', Norsk Teologisk Tidsskrift (Oslo: 1934), pp. 1ff.
 'The "Spirit" and the "Word" in the Pre-exilic Reforming Prophets', Journal of Biblical Literature Vol. 53 (1934) pp. 199–227.
 '"Anden" og "Ordet" hos de foreksilske reformprofeter', Norsk Teologisk Tidsskrift (Oslo: 1935), pp. 1ff.
 'Ekstatisk oplevelse og rasjonal bearbeidelse hos de gammeltestamentlige profeter', [translation: "Ecstatic experience and rational elaboration in Old Testament prophecy"] Theologisk Tidsskrift (known as "[D]TT") (Kobenhavn [Copenhagen]:1935), pp. 1ff.
 'Extatic Experience and Rational Elaboration in Old Testament Prophecy', Acta Orientalia Vol. 13 (Leiden: 1935), pp. 264–291.
 'Hat es ein israelitisches Nationalepos gegeben?' [translation: "Is there a given Israelite national epic?"], Zeitschrift fur die Alttestamentliche Wissenschaft'  Band (Vol.) 53 (Giessen: 1935) pp. 130ff.
 'Zur Geschichte der Dekalogue' [translation: "To a History of the Decalogue (Ten Commandments)"], Zeitschrift fur die Alttestamentliche Wissenschaft'  Band (Vol.) 55 (Giessen: 1937) pp. 218ff.
 Book Review of Widengren's Accadian and Hebrew Psalms of Lamentation which appeared in Norsk Teologisk Tidsskrift (Oslo: 1940), pp. 155. [G. Widengren's book itself was published at Stockholm, 1937].
 'Ras Shamra og det Gamle Testament', Norsk Teologisk Tidsskrift Vol. xl, (Oslo: 1939), pp. 16ff.
 'Oppkomsten av profetlitteraturen', Norsk Teologisk Tidsskrift (Oslo: 1942), pp. 65ff.
 'Kadesj, Sinai og Jahve', Norwegian Journal of Geography Vol. 9 (1942), pp. 21ff.
 'Nathanprofetien i 2. Sam. 7' [translation: "Nathan's prophecy in II Samuel 7"], Svensk exegetisk årsbok (known as SEÅ) (Uppsala: date ?), pp. 220ff.
 'Zum Problem der hebraischen Metrik' [translation: "Towards the Problem of the Hebrew Metric"], Bertholetfestschrift (Tübingen: 1950), pp. 379ff. [Bertholetfestschrift = Festschrift Alfred Bertholet zum 80. Geburtstag, herausgeg. von W. Baumgartner, O. Eissfeldt, K. Elliger, L. Rost>> translation: "Festschrift for Alfred Bertholet on his 80th Birthday--editors: W. Baumgartner, Otto Eissfeldt, K. Elliger and L. Rost"].
 'Den senjodiske salmediktning', Norsk Teologisk Tidsskrift (Oslo: 1950), pp. 1–54.
 'Zur hebraischen Metrik II' [translation: "Towards Hebrew Metric II"], Studia theologica cura ordinum theologorum Scandinavorum edita Vol. VII (1953), pp. 54ff.
 'Metrischer Aufbau und Textcritik, an Ps. 8 illustriert' [translation: "Metrical Construction and Textcriticism, illustrated on Psalm 8"], Studia Orientalia Johanno Pedersen Septuagenario...dicata [Studia Orientalia's volume celebrating the 70th birthday of Johannes Pedersen](Havniae [Copenhagen]: 1953), pp. 250ff.
 'Der metrische Aufbau von Jes. 62, 1 - 12 und die neuen sog. kurzverse' [translation: "The metrical construction of Isaiah 62: 1 - 12 and the new so-called ? shortverse"], Zeitschrift fur die Alttestamentliche Wissenschaft'  Band (Vol.) 65 (Giessen: 1953), pp. 167ff.
 'Zum Psalm des Habakuk' [translation: "Towards the Psalm of Habakkuk"], Theologische Zeitschrift Band (Vol.) 9 (Basel: 1953), pp. 1ff.
 'Psalm Criticism between 1900 and 1935 (Ugarit and Psalm Exegesis)', Vetus Testamentum Vol. 5 (Leiden: Brill, 1955) pp. 13ff.
 'Marginalien zur hebraischen Metrik', Zeitschrift fur die Alttestamentliche Wissenschaft'  Band (Vol.) 67 (Giessen: 1956) pp. 97ff.
 'Zu Psalm 16, 3 - 4' [translation: "To/towards Psalm 16: 3 - 4"], Theologische Literaturzeitung (1957), columns 649ff.
 'Notes on the Psalms', Studia theologica cura ordinum theologorum Scandinavorum edita Vol. XIII (1959), pp. 134ff.
 'Drive and/or Ride in the O.T.', Vetus Testamentum Vol. 12 (Leiden: Brill, 1962) pp. 278–299ff.

References

Other sources
 
 Hjelde, Sigurd (2006) Sigmund Mowinckel Und Seine Zeit: Leben Und Werk Eines Norwegischen Alttestamentlers (Mohr Siebeck Verlag)

Related Reading
Hayes, John Haralson (1974) Old Testament Form Criticism (Trinity University Press)   
Koch, Klaus (1969). The Growth of the Biblical Tradition: The Form-Critical Method (New York: Charles Scribner's Sons) 

1884 births
1965 deaths
People from Bodø
Norwegian theologians
Norwegian male writers
20th-century Protestant theologians
Old Testament scholars
University of Oslo alumni
Academic staff of the University of Oslo
Norwegian Christians
Translators of the Bible into Norwegian
20th-century translators
20th-century male writers
Lutheran biblical scholars
20th-century Lutherans